Antonio Larell Davis (born July 31, 1972) is a professional boxer in the Lightweight division. He's the former WBO NABO Featherweight and IBA Super Featherweight champion.

Pro career
In August 2007, Antonio upset the undefeated Leon Bobo to win the WBO NABO Featherweight championship.

WBC Super Featherweight Championship
On March 28, 2009, Davis was knocked out by WBC Super Featherweight champion Humberto Soto at the Plaza de Toros, Tijuana, Baja California, Mexico.

References

External links

Boxers from South Carolina
Lightweight boxers
1972 births
Living people
American male boxers